Lykling Church is a parish church of the Church of Norway in Bømlo Municipality in Vestland county, Norway. It is located in the village of Lykling on the island of Bømlo. It is the church for the Lykling parish which is part of the Sunnhordland prosti (deanery) in the Diocese of Bjørgvin. The white, wooden church was built in a long church design in 1912 using plans drawn up by the architect Victor Nordan. The church seats about 200 people.

History
The church was built in 1912 according to drawings by architect Victor Nordan. Originally, it consisted of a rectangular, wooden nave and a narrower choir flanked by two sacristies that had a common roof with the choir. Overall, the choir and sacristy were slightly wider than the nave. It was expanded and rebuilt in 1973 according to drawings by architect Ole Halvorsen. During this remodel, the choir received a somewhat lower and narrower, extension to the east, flanked by small rooms. At the same time, a large church porch was added on the west side.

See also
List of churches in Bjørgvin

References

Bømlo
Churches in Vestland
Long churches in Norway
Wooden churches in Norway
20th-century Church of Norway church buildings
Churches completed in 1912
1912 establishments in Norway